Khanmirza may refer to:
 Khanmirza District
 Khanmirza Rural District